The Love Songs is an album by Peter Hammill, originally released on Charisma Records in 1984.

The album is a compilation of ballads from Hammill's previous solo albums, re-recorded in new versions; all reworked, redubbed and remixed to form this album. The lead vocals were replaced on all tracks, except "Been Alone So Long". All tracks were based on the original multitracks,  except "Again" and "If I Could", which are based on live K Group performances taken from the Margin Tour.

Track listing

All songs written by Peter Hammill, except where indicated.

"Just Good Friends" - 3:55
"My Favourite" - 3:00
"Been Alone So Long" (Chris Judge Smith) - 5:02
"Ophelia" - 3:09
"Again" - 3:34
"If I Could" - 4:59
"Vision" - 3:16
"Don't Tell Me" - 4:40
"The Birds" - 3:41
"(This Side of) The Looking Glass" - 6:58

Original albums 

The tracks were taken from these albums:

 Patience
 PH7
 Nadir's Big Chance
 Sitting Targets
 In Camera
 The Future Now
 Fool's Mate
 Enter k
 Fool's Mate
 Over

Personnel 
Peter Hammill – vocals, guitar, keyboards, bass, drums
Graham Smith - violin (2)
David Jackson - saxophone (3,8.9)
Nic Potter - bass (5,6,9)
Guy Evans - drums (3,5,6,7,9)
Hugh Banton - organ (3,9)
Stuart Gordon - violin (1,7)
John Ellis - guitar (5,6)
Manny Elias - drums (1)
David Lord - synthesizer (1)
Technical
Paul Ridout - cover
Adrian Peacock - photography

References

Peter Hammill albums
1984 albums
Charisma Records albums